Shrimps for a Day is a 1934 Our Gang short comedy film directed by Gus Meins.  It was the 133rd Our Gang short (45th talking episode) that was released.

Plot
The gang resides at the Happy Home Orphanage, an inaptly named organization run by the dishonest, child-hating Mr. Crutch (Clarence Wilson) and Mrs. Crutch (Rosa Gore). Invited to a garden party at the home of wealthy Mr. Wade, the kids enjoy a good time and are showered with gifts, knowing full well that their new clothes and toys will be seized and sold by the Crutches once they return to the orphanage.

Meanwhile, Mr. Wade's daughter Mary (Doris McMahan) and her boyfriend Dick (Joe Young) stumble upon a magic lamp which grants them their wish: to be children again. Dick and Mary are summarily rounded up by the Crutches and bundled off to the orphanage, where they manage to get the goods on the underhanded operation. Spanky has some funny scenes, including one wherein he refuses to take a dose of castor oil and instead pushes it into Mr. Crutch's mouth. During a sleepless night, Spanky helps Dick escape out the window. Dick runs to Mary's house, where he finds the lamp and wishes he was an adult again. He then returns to being an adult and leads Mr. Wade back to the orphanage, exposing the Crutches and restoring Mary to adulthood. Spanky then has his revenge on Mr. Crutch by using the lamp to wish him down to his size, then beating him up.

Notes
 Shrimps for a Day, like the previous short Mama's Little Pirate, was an Our Gang foray into pure fantasy.
 This is the last appearance of Jackie Lynn Taylor. She had been in the series since early 1934.

Cast

The Gang
 Matthew Beard as Stymie
 Scotty Beckett as Scotty
 George McFarland as Spanky
 Billie Thomas as Buckwheat
 Jerry Tucker as Jerry
 Alvin Buckelew as Alvin
 Marianne Edwards as Marianne
 Leonard Kibrick as Leonard
 Jackie Lynn Taylor as Jane
 Gordon Evans as Boy who finds lamp
 Eileen Bernstein as Our Gang member
 Barbara Goodrich as Our Gang member
 Harry Harvey, Jr. as Our Gang member
 Paul Hilton as Our Gang member
 Philbrook Lyons as Our Gang member
 Tommy McFarland as Our Gang member
 Donald Profitt as Our Gang member
 Jackie White as Our Gang member
 Phyllis Yuse as Our Gang member

Additional cast
 Dick Brasno as Mr. Crutch as a child
 George Brasno as Dick as a child
 Olive Brasno as Mary as a child
 Herbert Evans as The butler
 Rosa Gore as Mrs. Crutch
 Wilfred Lucas as Mr. Wade, the sponsor
 Doris McMahan as Mary
 Ray Turner as Frightened man
 Clarence Wilson as Mr. Crutch
 Robert George Young as Dick 
 Laughing Gravy as Dog
 Marialise Gumm as Undetermined role
 Dorian Johnson as Undetermined role
 Joyce Kay as Undetermined role
 Fred Purner, Jr. as Undetermined role
 Delmar Watson as Undetermined role
Katherine Margaret Marshall as girl that shooed the duck

See also
 Our Gang filmography

References

External links
 
 
 

1934 films
1934 comedy films
American black-and-white films
Films directed by Gus Meins
American films about revenge
Hal Roach Studios short films
Our Gang films
1930s American films
1930s English-language films